Simon Andrew Richman (born 2 June 1990) is an English semi-professional footballer who plays for  club Bradford (Park Avenue) as a midfielder.

A former youth player with Port Vale, he was a regular in the first team throughout the 2008–09 season, picking up the club's young player of the year award. He was released in the summer of 2010, at which point he joined Worcester City for a season. He signed with Altrincham in June 2011, and helped the club to win promotion out of the Conference North via the play-offs in 2014 and to win the Northern Premier League Premier Division title in 2017–18 and the National League North play-offs again in 2020. After ten years with Altrincham, he joined Bradford (Park Avenue) in October 2021.

Career

Port Vale
Born in Ormskirk, Lancashire, Richman attended Maricourt Catholic School. A former member of the Bolton Wanderers Academy, Richman worked his way up the ranks from the Port Vale youth team to the Reserves and broke into the main team in the 2007–08 season, signing his first professional contract in April 2008.

At the beginning of the 2008–09 season he established himself as a first team regular, earning eight consecutive starts and also got his first league goal. However, as the season went on the Valiants made numerous loan signings and Richman went out of favour. On 6 December 2008, he came on as a substitute against Grimsby Town, scoring an 88th-minute winner. This gave manager Dean Glover a selection headache as the youngster battled with more experienced players for a first team slot. Following that match he played another 21 games that season, his consistent performances earning him the club's Young Player of the Year Award.

He picked up a groin injury in pre-season which sidelined him for several months. He was later transfer listed in late September, despite being injured, along with the entire Port Vale squad, after manager Micky Adams saw his team slip to a third consecutive defeat. In January 2010 he received interest off League Two club Grimsby Town and Scottish First Division side Ayr United. His agent, former Vale legend Phil Sproson, believed a loan move would be in the player's interests. On 20 February he made his first appearance in four months, replacing Tommy Fraser in a 2–0 defeat by Barnet. In April 2010 he learned that he would not be offered a new contract by manager Micky Adams.

Worcester City
In July 2010, Richman enjoyed a trial at Conference National club, and Conference North title holders Southport. The next month he was on trial at Worcester City, where former teammate Danny Glover had found a home. He signed a contract with the club soon after. He enjoyed a solid start to his career, and claimed that the club helped him to rediscover his passion for the game. Throughout the season he earned praised for his energy levels and work-rate.

Altrincham
Offered a new contract by Worcester, Richman instead opted to sign with league rivals Altrincham. He took this decision as his new club was closer to his Liverpool home, and because he had played under new manager Lee Sinnott at Port Vale. Richman made his Altrincham debut as a substitute in a 1–1 draw against Workington. He scored his first Altrincham goal in his second appearance, again as a substitute, in 3–0 win over Histon. The club missed out on the play-offs by 11 points in 2011–12, before securing a play-off spot by an 11-point margin in 2012–13. They were beaten 4–2 by Brackley Town in the play-off semi-finals, despite Richman scoring in a 2–1 victory at Moss Lane. The "Robins" again qualified for the play-offs in the 2013–14 campaign, and Richman played in the final as the club secured promotion with a 2–1 extra-time victory over Guiseley.

He played 43 games in the 2014–15 season to help Altrincham post a 17th-place finish. He made 42 appearances across the 2015–16 campaign as they were relegated in 22nd position. He played 33 games in the 2016–17 season as Altrincham were relegated out of the National League North in last place. They made an immediate return however, winning the Northern Premier League Premier Division title at the end of the 2017–18 season, with Richman scoring four goals from 42 matches. On 26 December 2018, Richman made his 300th appearance for Altrincham in a 2–0 defeat at Stockport County. He ended the 2018–19 season with one goal in 40 appearances, helping Altrincham to the play-offs, where they were defeated by Chorley on penalties in the semi-finals. He scored one goal in 31 appearances in the 2019–20 season, which was permanently suspended on 26 March due to the COVID-19 pandemic in England, with Altrincham in the play-offs in fifth-place. The play-offs took place in the summer and Altrincham secured promotion with a 1–0 victory over Boston United at York Street on 1 August. He played just 13 games in the 2020–21 campaign  and left the club at the end of the season.

Bradford (Park Avenue)
On 12 October 2021, Richman signed with Bradford (Park Avenue); manager Mark Bower said he was a "massive signing" who would help with Park Avenue's injuries in the midfield department. He played 27 times in the 2021–22 campaign, scoring four goals.

Career statistics

Honours
Altrincham
Conference North play-offs: 2013–14
Northern Premier League Premier Division: 2017–18
National League North play-offs: 2019–20

References

1990 births
Living people
People from Ormskirk
English footballers
Association football midfielders
Port Vale F.C. players
Worcester City F.C. players
Altrincham F.C. players
Bradford (Park Avenue) A.F.C. players
English Football League players
National League (English football) players
Universiade silver medalists for Great Britain
Universiade medalists in football
Medalists at the 2013 Summer Universiade